Monan is a town under the administration of Ruicheng County in far southern Shanxi province, China, situated on the northern (left) bank of the Yellow River, across which lies Henan province, on the southern slopes of the Zhongtiao Mountains. , it has 19 villages under its administration.

See also
List of township-level divisions of Shanxi

References

Township-level divisions of Shanxi